Citibank (Hong Kong) Limited (Chinese: 花旗銀行, formerly 萬國寶通銀行) is a Citigroup subsidiary, which is a licensed bank incorporated in Hong Kong.

History
Citibank began operations in Hong Kong in 1902, thus becoming the first foreign bank to offer its services there. The bank is based at Three Garden Road in Central, formerly known as Citibank Plaza.

Company profile
Citibank Hong Kong has a network of 48 branches spread over Hong Kong Island, Kowloon, New Territories and Macau.

Citibank’s parent company, Citigroup, has three main divisions in Hong Kong: Citi Markets & Banking, Global Consumer Group and Global Wealth management.

The Global Consumer Group operates under the Citibank brand and its financial products and services are offered through 25 branches, one of which is in Macau. Additionally, Citibank Hong Kong provides investment options in the form of bonds, mutual funds, insurance products, foreign currency trading and stock trading. Through Citigold Wealth Management Banking, clients get a customised plan on wealth management. Citibank Hong Kong is also one of the largest issuers of credit cards in Hong Kong.

Product lines and services
Like all other banks, Citibank Hong Kong offers various types of bank accounts options, investment products, loans and credit cards to its clients.

Mobile financial services
Through partnership with SK Telecom, Citibank has established Mobile Money Ventures to sell mobile financial services applications. Mobile Banking services were launched in Hong Kong in November 2008. The network- and device-independent mobile services platform supports diverse handsets; the platform is also available with customisable features like mobile stock trading. Customers of Citibank Hong Kong now have access to services such as account inquiry and management, transfer and payments, time deposits, stock trading, pending order management, stock quotation and portfolio management through their mobile phones.

The Octopus Credit Card

In July 2008, Citi launched a combined contactless Octopus travel and credit card in Hong Kong. With over 50,000 terminals operational, customers can use their Octopus cards to travel on public transportation, as well as make low-value contactless payments at participating retail outlets. The Octopus Rewards Scheme enables users to collect and spend points earned from participating merchants. Users can also avail of cash rebates by spending on their Octopus cards; the rebates are credited for further usage.

Similar partnerships have been forged with the Mass Rapid transit Systems (MRT) in Delhi and Singapore, and the New York City Metropolitan Transport Authority

Leadership 

 Regional Chief Executive: Peter Babej (since October 2019)
 Country Chief Executive: Aveline San (since August 2022)

Former Regional Chief Executive's 
The region-wide Chief Executive role was founded in 2008 and is based in Hong Kong.
Ajay Banga (2008–2009)
Shirish Apte and Stephen Bird (2009–2012)
Stephen Bird (2012–2015)
Francisco Aristeguieta (2015–2019)

Former Hong Kong and Macau Chief Executive Officer's 
List since the formation of Citigroup in 1998.
 Chan Tze-ching (1999–2003)
 Catherine Weir (2003–2004)
 Chan Tze-ching (2005–2007); second term
 Sim S Lim (2007–2008)
 Shengman Zhang (2008–2013)
 Weber Lo (2013–2018)
 Angel Ng (2018–2022)

See also
List of banks in Hong Kong

References

www.financialexpress.com
www.finextra.com
www.careertimes.com.hk

Citigroup
Banks of Hong Kong
Banks established in 1902
1902 establishments in Hong Kong